The following are the association football events of the year 1886 throughout the world.

Events
December 11 - Dial Square FC (later Arsenal) beat Eastern Wanderers 6-0, their first match.
December 25 - After a meeting in the Royal Oak pub, Woolwich, Dial Square rename themselves Royal Arsenal

Clubs founded in 1886

England
Dial Square F.C. (later to become Arsenal)
Bishop Auckland F.C. as Auckland Town FC
Glossop North End A.F.C.
Haverhill Rovers F.C.
Kidderminster Harriers F.C.
Leytonstone F.C.
Argyle Football Club, later Plymouth Argyle F.C.
Shrewsbury Town F.C.
Upton Park F.C.
Worthing F.C.

Scotland
Clachnacuddin F.C.
Motherwell FC

Northern Ireland
Linfield F.C.

Switzerland
Grasshopper Club Zürich (1 September)

Hong Kong
Hong Kong FC

Domestic cups

International tournaments
 1885–86 British Home Championship (February 27 – April 10, 1886)

Births
 1 January – Harold Halse (d. 1949), England international forward in one match (1909), scoring two goals; the first player to appear in three FA Cup finals for three different clubs.
 16 February – Andy Ducat (d. 1942), England international half-back in six matches (1910–1920).
 25 December – Jock Simpson (d. 1959), England international forward in eight matches (1911–1914).

References